Jimmy Connors and Ilie Năstase didn't defend their title, they played in North Conway instead.
Juan Gisbert and Manuel Orantes claimed the title and $6,000 first-prize money following victory over Wojciech Fibak and Hans-Jürgen Pohmann in the final.

Seeds
A champion seed is indicated in bold text while text in italics indicates the round in which that seed was eliminated.

Draw

Finals

Top half

Bottom half

References

External links

U.S. Clay Court Championships
1975 U.S. Clay Court Championships